The Făget mine is a large mine in the northwest of Romania in Rodna, Bistrița-Năsăud County, 50 km southwest of Bistriţa and 699 km north-west of the capital, Bucharest. Făget represents one of the largest lead and zinc reserve in Romania having estimated reserves of 9.25 million tonnes of ore grading 0.79% lead and 2.48% zinc thus resulting in 0.07 million tonnes of lead and 0.23 million tonnes of zinc.

References 

Lead and zinc mines in Romania